The 14th World Science Fiction Convention (Worldcon), also known as NyCon II or NEWYORCON, was held on 31 August–3 September 1956 at the Biltmore Hotel in New York City, United States.

The chairman was David A. Kyle.

Participants 

Attendance was approximately 850.

Guests of Honor 

 Arthur C. Clarke
 Robert Bloch (toastmaster)

Awards

1956 Hugo Awards 

 Best Novel: Double Star, by Robert A. Heinlein
 Best Novelette: "Exploration Team", by Murray Leinster
 Best Short Story: "The Star", by Arthur C. Clarke
 Best Professional Artist: Frank Kelly Freas
 Best Professional Magazine: Astounding
 Best Fanzine: (tie)
 Inside, edited by Ron Smith
 Science Fiction Advertiser, edited by Ron Smith
 Best Feature Writer: Willy Ley
 Best Book Reviewer: Damon Knight
 Most Promising New Author: Robert Silverberg

Future site selection 

The primary bid for the 15th World Science Fiction Convention was for London. This would be the first Worldcon outside North America, and there was a small but vocal jingoistic faction of Americans who argued for retaining the Worldcon in North America, claiming "If we let them have it they'll never give it back". Their campaign against the London proposal was opposed by other Americans, most audibly Anthony Boucher, and the London bid won by an ample margin, to loud cheers. There were reportedly petty efforts even after the vote was over to sabotage the London bid, but they failed to hinder it.

Notes 

It was at this Worldcon that a group of fans (including Bob Tucker, Boyd Raeburn, Dick Eney, Ron Ellik, and Ted White) who had not paid the $7 fee for the convention banquet chose to sit in the balcony and listen to the Guest of Honor speeches. Convention chair Kyle had a messenger tell the "Balcony Insurgents" that Kyle had said they could not sit there. Since almost every fan who wrote about the convention reported the incident, "Dave Kyle Says You Can't Sit Here" became a fannish catchphrase.

See also 

 Hugo Award
 Science fiction
 Speculative fiction
 World Science Fiction Society
 Worldcon

References

External links 

 

1956 conferences
1956 in New York City
1956 in the United States
Science fiction conventions in the United States
Worldcon